Ruperto Marvin Atencio Delgado is a Costa Rican lawyer, health professional, and deputy.

Atencio had a case before the Caja Costarricense del Seguro Social for failure to pay a worker on his farm, although the case has since been resolved.

Atencio worked as an administrative health professional before being elected deputy. He is a member of Sindicato de Profesionales en Ciencias Médicas de la Caja Costarricense de Seguro Social (Siprocimeca) (Union of Scientific Medical Workers of the Costa Rican Social Security System).

He was elected deputy in 2014 and will serve until 2018.

References

Living people
Members of the Legislative Assembly of Costa Rica
People from San José, Costa Rica
Citizens' Action Party (Costa Rica) politicians
20th-century Costa Rican lawyers
Year of birth missing (living people)